Sir Francis Clerke (c. 1624 – 25 February 1686) was an English lawyer and politician  who sat in the House of Commons between 1661 and 1685. 

Clerke was the son of Henry Clerke of Rochester, who was a lawyer and MP for Rochester. Clerke inherited his father's property which included Restoration House at Rochester.  During the English Civil War, the house had been sequestered and occupied by Colonel Gibbon, Cromwell's commander in South East England. When King Charles II returned to London in 1660, Rochester was an important stopping place on the way, and Restoration House was fitted out to provide an overnight base for the King and his family.

Clerke was elected Member of Parliament (MP) for Rochester in 1661 for the Cavalier Parliament until 1679. He was re-elected in 1681 and held the seat to 1685.

Clerke resided at Ulcombe-place, and died in 1685. His son Francis was also MP for Rochester.

References

1620s births
1686 deaths
Year of birth uncertain
English MPs 1661–1679
English MPs 1681
English MPs 1685–1687